Menegazzia globoisidiata is a species of foliose lichen in the family Parmeliaceae. It was formally described in 2007 by John Elix, based on specimens found in Australia.

See also
List of Menegazzia species

References

globoisidiata
Lichen species
Lichens described in 2007
Lichens of Australia
Taxa named by John Alan Elix